Air Pocket is the second album by American keyboardist Roger Powell released on Bearsville Records in 1980. It includes 11 tracks all written, performed, and sung by the artist, and features Todd Rundgren on ebow guitar on one track. Other credits include John Holbrook, Cleve Pozar, and Mark Styles. Voted the #1 album of 1980 by a reader poll in Keyboard Magazine. Originally completed in 1976, Bearsville agreed to release "Air Pocket" after releasing a single first to see how much interest there would be. The single "Pipeline '78" B/W "March Of The Dragon Slayers" was released in May of 1978 and sold respectfully.

Track listing

Personnel 

John Holbrook – rhythm guitar, engineer
Roger Powell – vocals, synthesizer, keyboards, producer
Cleve Pozar – drums
Todd Rundgren – guitar
Mark Styles – keyboards
Produced by Roger Powell

Charts
Album - Billboard

References 

Roger Powell (musician) albums
1980 albums
Bearsville Records albums